Hutan Kampung Highway, Federal Route 175(Formerly Kedah State Road K5), is a major highway in Alor Star, Kedah, Malaysia.

List of junctions and towns

Highways in Malaysia